Sir Charles Phillip Vinchon Des Voeux, 1st Baronet (died 24 August 1814) was an Irish politician.

Des Voeux was the son of Martin Anthony Vinchon de Bacquencourt, who had assumed the surname of Des Voeux after leaving France to settle in Ireland having abandoned the Roman Catholic faith. Des Voeux made a fortune in India before returning to Ireland and representing Carlow Borough in the Irish House of Commons between 1783 and 1790. On 1 September 1787 he was created a baronet, of Indiaville in the Baronetage of Ireland. He represented Carlingford in the Irish Commons from 1790 to 1797. He was succeeded in his title by his son, also called Charles. Des Voeux was the grandfather of William Des Vœux.

References

Year of birth unknown
1814 deaths
Irish MPs 1783–1790
Irish MPs 1790–1797
Baronets in the Baronetage of Ireland
Members of the Parliament of Ireland (pre-1801) for County Carlow constituencies
Members of the Parliament of Ireland (pre-1801) for County Louth constituencies
Des Voeux family